Ulama may refer to:

In Islam
 Ulema, also transliterated "ulama", a community of legal scholars of Islam and its laws (sharia). See:
Nahdlatul Ulama (Indonesia)
Darul-uloom Nadwatul Ulama (Lucknow)
Jamiatul Ulama Transvaal
Jamiat ul-Ulama (disambiguation)

Other
 Ulama (game), a modern variety of the Mesoamerican ballgame
 Spot-bellied eagle owl, "ulama" in Sinhalese, a large bird of prey
 Devil Bird, a cryptid in Sri Lankan folklore